Innisfail railway station is located on the North Coast line in Queensland, Australia. It serves the town of Innisfail. The station has one platform.

Services
Innisfail is served by Traveltrain's Spirit of Queensland service.

References

External links

Innisfail station Queensland's Railways on the Internet

Regional railway stations in Queensland
North Coast railway line, Queensland
Buildings and structures in Innisfail, Queensland